Alexander Rybakov may refer to:

 Alexander Rybakov (ice hockey) (born 1985), Russian ice hockey forward
 Alexander Rybakov (cyclist) (born 1988), Russian cyclist